Frankfort is a small farming town situated on the banks of the Wilge River in the Free State province of South Africa. The town was laid out in 1869 on the farm Roodepoort, and named Frankfurt (after Frankfurt-am-Main in Germany) by Albert van Gordon. The town later received municipality status in 1896.

Frankfort is now the capital town to Villiers, Cornelia and Tweeling, called the Mafube Municipality. The main street is 'Brand Street', named after the 4th president of the Orange Free State, Sir Johannes Brand. The name has since changed to J.J Hadebe. During 1883, he visited the town and laid the cornerstone of the Dutch Reformed Church. This church was burnt down by the British troops during the Second Boer War (1899–1902). After the war the church was rebuilt and inaugurated in 1918. The Second Boer War was disastrous for the town; according to one contemporary source there were ′not a house or tree′ remaining after the destruction.

Sports History 
This town has produced notable soccer players like Paul Motaung (former Kaizer Chiefs defender) and Chris Motaung (former Swallows midfielder),Thabo Motsoeneng (former Bloemfontein Celtics) other professional football players include Thomas Mofokeng, Ernest Nkosi and Dlangamandla. Frederich Lombaard a former Cheetah and Springbok rugby player, and academics like Professor M.J Lenake and Dr Mahlathini Tshabalala, who is now based in Gauteng and the renowned Motloung brothers Paul and Michael who are based in Botshabelo and Bloemfontein respectively. Mamontha Modise and Sophie Mokoena former Lesedi FM anchors. The first black comrade marathon winner, Mr Tshabalala, also comes from this town.

Notes

Populated places in the Mafube Local Municipality
Populated places founded by Afrikaners
Populated places established in 1878
1878 establishments in the Orange Free State